Darband-e Sofla may refer to:
 Darband-e Sofla, Dargaz
 Darband-e Sofla, Sarakhs